Madeleine-Françoise Calais (1713 or 1714 - fl. 1740) was a French dentist, and the first female dentist to obtain a license as a master dentist from the Surgical Society of Paris. 

She was a native of Paris, France. In 1732, when she was eighteen years old, she was accepted as a student of the dentist Gérandly of Paris. She graduated in 1735, and worked as his dentist assistant for the following five years. 

In 1740, she wished to practice independently as a dentist and consequently applied for a license as a master dentist from the Surgical Society of Paris when she was twenty-seven years old. She duly passed all tests of knowledge required. She also had good recommendations from her clients. However, the Surgical Society was hesitant to issue a dentist license. While the dentist profession did not have a guild and was, in theory, not forbidden for women, the license had never before been issued to a woman.

The Surgical Society therefore consulted Guillaume-François Joly de Fleury of the Paris Parlement. One of the members of Parliament, Pelletier, supported her request, as did Gabriel Bachelier, valet de chambre to the king. The royal surgeon of the king, François Gigot de la Peyronie initially opposed the request in a letter of 21 October 1740. However, la Peyronie reconsidered and eventually recommended that her request be granted with the motivation that few professions were legal for women and hard working and intelligent women must be given some legal opportunity to support themselves.

Her request was therefore granted, in 1740, and she was allowed to open her own dentist practice. She is noted to have had some success, particularly among women.  

She has been referred to as the first female dentist in France, though there are examples of other female dentists in 18th-century France. A Mademoiselle Reze published a dentistry treatise a few years before "Le Chirugien Dentiste" by Pierre Fauchard, and a Madame Ana made a successful career as a "dentist for women" in a clinic on the Rue Rivoli in Paris, being the dentist of the royal Duchess of Angouleme. It must be noted, however, that the profession of dentistry did not become a regulated medical profession until the 19th-century.

References

18th-century French women
French dentists
1710s births